Belønningen is a 1980 Norwegian drama film written and directed by Bjørn Lien, starring Rolf Søder and Joachim Calmeyer. It was entered into the 12th Moscow International Film Festival where it won the Silver Prize.

Reidar (Søder) was in the merchant navy during the war, but has since become an alcoholic and a bum. One day outside Vinmonopolet (the government owned alcoholic beverage monopoly), he bumps into successful businessman Sverre Nordvåg (Calmeyer), and drops his bottle of liquor. The two begin to fight, and the police get involved. It turns out the two knew each other before the German occupation of Norway, but fell out when Sverre began to collaborate with the Germans. A young journalist gets involved in the story of the two men during the proceeding trial.

Cast
 Rolf Søder as Reidar
 Joachim Calmeyer as Sverre Nordvåg
 Elsa Lystad as Ann
 Tone Danielsen as Unni
 Nils Sletta as Rune
 Svein Sturla Hungnes as Terje
 Lars Andreas Larssen as Terje
 Bente Børsum as Elisabeth Norvåg
 Per Erling Dahl as Fossum
 Morten Søder as Reidar som ung
 Kirsten Hofseth as Ann as young

References

External links
 
 Belønningen at Filmweb.no (Norwegian)

1980 films
1980 drama films
Norwegian drama films
1980s Norwegian-language films